Nurali Rural District is a rural district (dehestan) in the Central District of Delfan County, Lorestan Province, Iran. At the 2006 census, its population was 7,173, in 1,531 families.  The rural district has 37 villages.

References 

Rural Districts of Lorestan Province
Delfan County